Nicolò Casilio (L'Aquila, 12 October 1998) is an Italian rugby union player.
His usual position is as a Scrum-Half and he currently plays for Colorno in Top10.

Under contract with Top10 team Calvisano, for 2019–20 Pro14 season, he was a Permit Player for Zebre in Pro 14. He palyed for Zebre Parma in United Rugby Championship from 2020 to 2023.

In 2018, Casilio was named in the Italy Under 20 squad. On the 14 October 2021, he was selected by Alessandro Troncon to be part of an Italy A 28-man squad for the 2021 end-of-year rugby union internationals.

References

External links 
It's RugbyFrance profile
Ultimate Rugby Profile

1998 births
Living people
Italian rugby union players
People from L'Aquila
Zebre Parma players
Rugby Calvisano players
Rugby union scrum-halves
Sportspeople from the Province of L'Aquila
Rugby Colorno players